This is a list of fighter aces in World War II from Spain who fought with the Soviet Union and Nazi Germany. For other countries see List of World War II aces by country.

B 
Vicente Beltrán (USSR)
Luis Azqueta Brunet (Germany)

C 
Antonio García Cano (USSR)
Manuel Zarauza Claver (USSR)
Fernando Sánchez Arjona Courtoy (Germany)
Fernando Bengoa Cremades (Germany)

L 
José Luis Larrañaga (USSR)
Ángel Salas Larrazábal (Germany)
Vicente Aldecoa Lecanda (Germany)
Dámaso Arango López (Germany)

M 
Mariano Cuadra Medina (Germany)

O 
Bernardo Meneses Orozco (Germany)

P 
Francisco Meroño Pellicer (USSR)
Lorenzo Lucas Fernández Peña (Germany)
José Ramón Gavilán Ponce de León (Germany)

R 
José Mateos Recio (Germany)

S 
Juan Lario Sánchez (USSR)
Manuel Sánchez-Tabernero de Prada (Germany)
José Pascual Santamaría (USSR)

Z 
Francisco Valiente Zárraga (Germany)

World War II flying aces
Spain
Flying aces
 Flying aces